Sprague, built at Dubuque, Iowa's Iowa Iron Works in 1901 by Captain Peter Sprague for the Monongahela River Consolidated Coal and Coke Company, was the world's largest steam powered sternwheeler towboat. She was nicknamed Big Mama, and was capable of pushing 56 coal barges at once. She was decommissioned as a towboat in 1948.

Legacy

After decommissioning, Sprague became a museum on the Vicksburg, Mississippi, waterfront. For many years the long-running melodrama Gold in the Hills was performed there. The boat burned in Vicksburg on 15 April 1974, and as of 2019, pieces still remain in Vicksburg, Mississippi.

A model of Sprague is in the National Mississippi River Museum & Aquarium in Dubuque, Iowa. The model was made in 1908 by Elizabeth Marine Ways a steamboat yard in Elizabeth, Pennsylvania, and was put on show at the Pittsburgh Exposition of 1908. Another model of Sprague can be found in the Portland Museum in the Portland neighborhood of Louisville, KY.

The Friends of the Sprague organization sponsored a mural entitled The Big Mama of the Mississippi as one of the Vicksburg Riverfront Murals. It was dedicated on 23 March 2007.

References

Riverboats
Towboats
Steamboats of the United States
1904 ships
Former National Register of Historic Places
Ships built in Iowa